"River of Love" is a 2008 song by George Strait.

River of Love may also refer to:

"River of Love" (Rick Price song), 1995
River of Love, an album by David Foster, or its title song, 1990
"River of Love", a song by Lynch Mob from Wicked Sensation, 1990
"River of Love", a song by T-Bone Burnett from T-Bone Burnett, 1986
The River of Love (album), by Don McLean, 1995
The River of Love (film), a 1960 Egyptian film